The Triaca Company was a brewery and distributor located in Baltimore, Maryland.

History
The Triaca Company was founded in 1882 by Marcello Triaca on 98 Light Street and Camden avenue in Baltimore, Maryland. Triaca gained some national notoriety in 1884 for losing $5,600 to a fellow Italian in an elaborate swindle involving money handling.

With prohibition pending, all distributors were given until January 16, 1920, to sell or export their stocks out of the country. In December 1919, Triaca company president Charles Vincenti shipped thirty-six thousand cases and twelve thousand barrels of whiskey to Bimini. Vincenti was taken by force in boat raid by revenue agents and taken back to Baltimore for trial before the British Colonial Government demand his return for capture in their territorial waters. In 1920, Whiskey was distributed to cooperative households throughout the Baltimore area like the A.T. Caroza Ingleside Mansion in Catonsville. Carozza, a road contractor bought a steamship from the Navy and sued the government to return his 500 case whiskey gift from Vincetti. After agents seized cases of Whiskey, a trial against the owners, drivers, salesmen, and holders of the Whisky in 1922. The trial became part of the Triaca Conspiracy, also known as the "Million Dollar Whiskey Conspiracy".

Timeline

1882: Company Founded
1890: Moved to Light Street & Camden ave 
1904: Great Baltimore Fire
1909: Move to Light and Pratt Street

See also
 List of defunct breweries in the United States

Notes and references

Beer brewing companies based in Maryland
Defunct brewery companies of the United States
Buildings and structures in Baltimore
Former buildings and structures in Maryland
Food and drink companies established in 1882
Food and drink companies disestablished in 1920
1882 establishments in Maryland
1920 disestablishments in Maryland
Defunct companies based in Baltimore